A Feud There Was is a 1938 Warner Bros. Merrie Melodies cartoon directed by Tex Avery. The short was released on September 24, 1938 and features the fourth appearance of an early version of Elmer Fudd.

Plot
The short begins with an establishing shot of a family of hillbillies, the Weavers, whose members are all lazy to the point of absurdity. The only thing that awakens the Weavers from their perpetual sloth is the opportunity to feud with their neighbors, the McCoys. After a musical number (then a staple of Merrie Melodies shorts) accompanied by a radio commercial (ostensibly over KFWB; the ad is read by Gil Warren, who was an actual KFWB announcer), the two families begin feuding, firing at each other with various semi-automatic weapons.  At one point, a McCoy asks if there are any Weavers in the movie audience. One man, shown as a silhouette against the screen, answers in the affirmative and fires a shot at the McCoy.

In the midst of the fray, a yodeling, bulbous-nosed, domestic peace activist who is accompanied by church organ music each time he speaks, enters the feud zone on a motorscooter bearing the words "Elmer Fudd, Peace Maker", and goes to each side preaching peace and an end to the bloodshed, only to get shot in the back (non-fatally) by each family as he departs, unimpressed by his attempts to broker a ceasefire. When Fudd attempts once more to preach peace to both families from the boundary line, both sides get furious at him, storm down to the boundary line, and try to beat up the would-be peace maker together. When the smoke clears, only Elmer is left standing as everyone else has been knocked out cold, thus fulfilling Elmer's original intention to broker peace between the two families. He gives a final yodel and says "Good night, all!", and the Weaver in the movie audience yells "Good night!," taking one more shot at the star as the film closes out.

Home media
LaserDisc - The Golden Age of Looney Tunes, Volume 3, Side 8.

Notes
This cartoon is the first in which the name Elmer Fudd was used, seen inscribed on the side of a scooter he is driving. However, the lobby card for The Isle of Pingo Pongo says, "Featuring Elmer".
This cartoon was re-released into the Blue Ribbon Merrie Melodies program on September 11, 1943. On September 13, 1952, the cartoon was released again, with new opening and closing title cards. This version is seen on television and on The Golden Age of Looney Tunes LaserDisc.
Additionally, A Feud There Was is notable for being the first re-release into the Blue Ribbon Merrie Melodies program, a program that would save Warner Bros. a lot of money for the next twenty years by re-releasing cartoons. For the first 13 years, the credits were also scrapped, but later, they were kept. The gap between the keeping and splitting of the credits would determine which cartoons whose copyrights were sold to Associated Artists Productions in 1956, with some exceptions.
Elmer's speaking voice was provided on this occasion by Mel Blanc. The character's singing voice was provided by Roy Rogers and additional vocals in the cartoon were done by the Sons of the Pioneers.
The original titles have been found in an eBay auction in 2007. A unreleased restored print of this short was aired on MeTV's Saturday Morning Cartoons. However, the Blue Ribbon titles were restored instead.
The European Turner "dubbed" version alters the original 1937–38 ending rendition of Merrily We Roll Along to the 1938-41 ending rendition. The American Turner print alters the ending rendition the 1941-55 rendition.
As the restored print uses the European Turner print's soundtrack, the error persists in that version.

References

External links

1938 animated films
Elmer Fudd films
1938 films
Merrie Melodies short films
Warner Bros. Cartoons animated short films
Films directed by Tex Avery
Films about feuds
1930s American animated films